The Paranoia Complex is an unlicensed video game based on the pen and paper role-playing game Paranoia. It was released in 1989 by Magic Bytes for Amiga, Amstrad CPC, Commodore 64 and ZX Spectrum. It takes the form of a top-down maze shooter and reviews at the time pegged it as mediocre to poor.

References

External links
The Paranoia Complex on World of Spectrum

1989 video games
Amiga games
Amstrad CPC games
Commodore 64 games
Paranoia (role-playing game)
Unauthorized video games
Video games based on tabletop role-playing games
Video games developed in the United Kingdom
ZX Spectrum games
Magic Bytes games